Lawrence Cleveland "Larry" Chambers (born June 10, 1929) is the first African American to command a U.S. Navy aircraft carrier and the first African-American graduate of the Naval Academy to reach flag rank. While in command of  during Operation Frequent Wind, Chambers gave the controversial order to push overboard millions of dollars' worth of UH-1 Huey helicopters so Republic of Vietnam Air Force Major Buang-Ly could land on the aircraft carrier in a Cessna O-1 Bird Dog with his wife and five children, thereby saving their lives.

Early life and education 
Born in Bedford, Virginia, in 1929, Chambers was the third of five children raised by his mother, Charlotte Chambers (including his brother Andrew, who later became a lieutenant general in the U.S. Army). After Chambers' father died, his mother began working in the War Department to support the family.

Chambers served in Junior ROTC while attending Dunbar High School in Washington, D.C. After graduating as class valedictorian and commander of the corps of cadets, Chambers considered using the college/university level ROTC program to also pay for college. However, Wesley A. Brown, the first African American graduate of the U.S. Naval Academy, encouraged him to apply there. Chambers did and became the second African American to graduate from the Naval Academy on June 6, 1952.

Chambers had mixed feelings about his time at the Naval Academy, not returning to visit for twenty years. He would later say, "While I had some good memories, I also had some tough memories."

Career 
In 1954, after 18 months of flight training, Chambers was designated as a Naval Aviator.  His first fleet assignment was to an air-antisubmarine warfare squadron, VS-37, where he flew the Grumman AF Guardian. Transitioning to the light attack community, he later flew the A-1 Skyraider with VA-215 and then, following postgraduate education, transitioned to jet light attack aircraft, flying the A-4 Skyhawk with VA-125 and VA-22. He then established VA-67 (later VA-15) as its first commanding officer, flying the A-7 Corsair II.

After being promoted to rear admiral, Chambers later served as commander of Carrier Strike Group Three and later as interim commander of Carrier Strike Group Four. He finished his career as vice commander of the Naval Air Systems Command.

Operation Frequent Wind

In April 1975, while in command of the aircraft carrier USS Midway, Chambers was ordered to "make best speed" to the waters off South Vietnam as North Vietnam overran the country to take part in Operation Frequent Wind, the evacuation of U.S. and South Vietnamese personnel. At the time the carrier was in Subic Bay Naval Base with the engineering plant partially torn apart.

Chambers has stated that he received no official order to start the operation, which began on April 29. Instead, when Nguyễn Cao Kỳ, the Vice President of South Vietnam, landed on the flight deck, Chambers figured the operation was underway. Soon the carrier's flight deck was full of helicopters carrying refugees from the fall of South Vietnam.

On that same day, South Vietnamese air force major Buang-Ly loaded his wife and five children into a two-seat Cessna O-1 Bird Dog and took off from Con Son Island. After evading enemy ground fire, Major Buang headed out to sea and spotted the Midway. The Midways crew attempted to contact the aircraft on emergency frequencies but the pilot continued to circle overhead with his landing lights turned on. When a spotter reported that there were at least four people in the two-place aircraft, all thoughts of forcing the pilot to ditch alongside were abandoned—it was unlikely the passengers of the overloaded Bird Dog could survive the ditching and safely escape before the plane sank. After three tries, Major Buang managed to drop a note from a low pass over the deck: 

After consultation with the USS Midway Carrier Task Force CO, Admiral William L. Harris, Chambers issued the order to allow the plane to land on the Midways flight deck. The arresting wires were then removed, all helicopters that could not be safely or quickly relocated were pushed over the side and into the sea. An estimated  worth of UH-1 Huey helicopters were pushed overboard into the South China Sea. With a 500-foot ceiling, five miles' visibility, light rain, and 15 knots of surface wind, Chambers ordered the ship to make 25 knots into the wind. Warnings about the dangerous downdrafts created behind a steaming carrier were transmitted blind in both Vietnamese and English. To make matters worse, five additional UH-1s landed and cluttered up the deck. Chambers ordered them scuttled as well. Captain Chambers recalled in an article in the Fall 1993 issue of the Naval Aviation Museum Foundatio's Foundation magazine that:

Major Buang was escorted to the bridge, where Chambers congratulated him on his outstanding piloting and his bravery. The crew of Midway was so impressed that they established a fund to help him and his family get settled in the United States. The Bird Dog that Major Buang landed is now on display at the National Naval Aviation Museum at Naval Air Station Pensacola, Florida.

At the time, Chambers had only been in command of USS Midway for four or five weeks and believed that his order would  get him court martialed. He also called Buang-Ly the "Bravest man I have ever met in my life" and said of his decision to allow Ly to land that "When a man has the courage to put his family in a plane and make a daring escape like that, you have to have the heart to let him in."

Later life 

After retiring from the Navy, Chambers became director of program development at System Development Corporation. In 2010, Chambers took part in commemorations honoring Operation Frequent Wind.

On April 29, 2015, Chambers traveled to San Diego, California, to speak aboard USS Midway, now a museum ship open to the public, in commemoration of the 40th anniversary of Operation Frequent Wind.

References 

1929 births
21st-century African-American people
African-American United States Navy personnel
Dunbar High School (Washington, D.C.) alumni
Living people
Military personnel from Virginia
People from Bedford, Virginia
United States Naval Academy alumni
United States Naval Aviators
United States Navy personnel of the Vietnam War
United States Navy rear admirals
African Americans in the Vietnam War
20th-century African-American people